Dixon is a city and the county seat of Lee County, Illinois, United States.  The population was 15,733 as of the 2010 census, down from 15,941 in 2000. The city is named after founder John Dixon, who operated a rope ferry service across the Rock River, which runs through the city. The Illinois General Assembly designated Dixon as "Petunia Capital of Illinois" in 1999 and "The Catfish Capital of Illinois" in 2009.

Dixon was the boyhood home of former U.S. President Ronald Reagan. The city is also the site of the Lincoln Monument State Memorial, marking the spot where Abraham Lincoln joined the Illinois militia at Fort Dixon in 1832 during the Black Hawk War. The memorial is located on the west side of Dixon's main north-south street, Galena Avenue, (U.S. Route 52, also Illinois Route 26), north of the Rock River.

History
Around 1828, Joseph Ogee, a man of mixed French and Native American descent, established a ferry and a cabin along the banks of the Rock River. In 1829, an employee of Ogee was named postmaster at the newly constructed post office. John Dixon, the eponymous founder, bought Ogee's Ferry in the spring of 1830 and brought his family to his newly purchased establishment on April 11 of that year. Shortly after, the name of the post office was changed to Dixon's Ferry.

On May 4, 1873, the Truesdell Bridge collapsed resulting in the deaths of 45 people.  A large number of people were on the bridge in order to watch a baptism ceremony in the river below.

Running by Interstate 88 is a road named Bloody Gulch Road. The road is named after a murder and body disposal. On September 12, 1885, two young men walked along a county road south of Dixon, one a farm hand named Joseph M. Mosse and the other, Frank C. Thiel, a traveling salesman from Elgin, IL. The unemployed farmhand told the salesman of a place he could sell his Bibles and proceeded to take him to a farm where he had worked. As the two men passed a gulch the farmhand struck and killed the salesman with a knife and a walnut baluster he was seen carrying under his arm. He then buried the body in the culvert. The body was later discovered when cattle refused to use the underpass en route to a milking barn. An overnight rain had washed away some of the dirt exposing a limb. When the sheriff arrived to question the farm hand, since he was seen leaving Dixon with the deceased, he pretended to get a drink while throwing a watch chain taken from the salesman in the bushes. The evidence was found and the farmhand was eventually put in jail for life, while the road over the underpass began to be called Bloody Gulch Road.

In April 2012, Dixon Municipal Comptroller Rita Crundwell was indicted by a Federal Grand Jury for embezzlement. She used the embezzled funds to pay for her lavish lifestyle and what became one of the nation's best-known quarter horse-breeding programs, among other things. Crundwell's crimes, thought to be the most substantial municipal theft in U.S. history, impacted Dixon's finances severely. Federal prosecutors estimated the amount embezzled at $53 million since 1990. The city sued the auditors who had failed to detect the embezzlement and the bank at which Crundwell maintained a secret account, and received $40 million in settlements. In February 2013, Crundwell was sentenced to almost 20 years in prison.

On May 16, 2018, Matthew Milby, a 19-year-old student, entered Dixon High School and fired shots during graduation practice. He was pursued by School Resource Officer Mark Dallas, of the Dixon Police Department. After firing shots at the officer, the shooter was wounded by Dallas as he returned fire. He was then taken into custody. There were no additional injuries. Milby was diagnosed with schizotypal personality disorder and initially found unfit to stand trial. On July 14, 2022 he pleaded guilty to aggravated discharge of a firearm towards a peace officer and aggravated discharge of a firearm in a school building; he was sentenced to thirty years in prison.

Ronald Reagan
Dixon was the boyhood home of the 40th President of the United States, Ronald Reagan. Reagan was born in nearby Tampico and moved to Dixon, aged nine. In his teen years, he lifeguarded along the banks of the Rock River. His family house is preserved at 816 South Hennepin Avenue, and authorized by Congress to become the Ronald Reagan Boyhood Home.  On February 6, 1984, during his first term as president, Reagan returned to Dixon to celebrate his 73rd birthday. He toured his boyhood residence and the city held a parade in his honor.

Geography

Climate 
Dixon has a hot summer humid continental climate (Köppen: Dfa) with four seasons. The winters are generally cold and see frequent snowfall, while the summers are warm and humid. Typically Dixon ranges from a low of 10°F (-12°C) to a high of 82°F (28°C). A low of -32°F (-35°C) was recorded during the January–February 2019 North American cold wave, and a record high of 110°F (43°C) was recorded during the 1936 North American heat wave.

Demographics

As of the census of 2000, 15,941 people, 5,681 households, and 3,488 families resided in the city. The city's racial makeup included 86.33% White, 10.48% African American, 0.14% Native American, 0.82% Asian, 0.05% Pacific Islander, 1.10% from other races, and 1.09% from two or more races. Hispanic or Latino of any race comprised 4.30% of the population.

There were 5,681 households, out of which 29.8% had children under the age of 18 living with them, 45.7% were married couples living together, 11.8% had a female householder with no husband present, and 38.6% were non-families. 32.6% of all households were made up of individuals, and 14.7% had someone living alone who was 65 years of age or older. The average household size was 2.32 and the average family size was 2.94.

In the city, the population was spread out, with 20.9% under the age of 18, 8.9% from 18 to 24, 34.6% from 25 to 44, 20.7% from 45 to 64, and 14.9% who were 65 years of age or older. The median age was 37 years. For every 100 females, there were 110.5 males. For every 100 females age 18 and over, there were 112.6 males.

The median income for a household in the city was $35,720, and the median income for a family was $45,088. Males had a median income of $32,511 versus $21,777 for females. The per capita income for the city was $16,630. About 5.7% of families and 10.1% of the population were below the poverty line, including 10.7% of those under age 18 and 12.0% of those age 65 or over.

Economy

Dixon is a regional employment hub and is part of two fast growing distribution and warehousing and food processing districts: one is I-88 West and the other, the I-39 Logistics Corridor. The biggest industries are healthcare and government. Healthcare employs over 1,700, while government jobs approach 1,500. The Dixon Correctional Center employs over 600 workers, as does the Department of Transportation. KSB Hospital has nearly 1,000 employees. Dixon has many industries employing thousands of the region's residents. The largest are Raynor Garage Doors, Donaldson Inc., Borg Warner, and Spectrum Brands. Fifteen miles away in Ashton, Crest Foods employs over 600.

Arts and culture

 The city of Dixon has numerous art venues including: a downtown art gallery, 2 galleries held in museums, and several private business galleries. Dixon also has a performing arts theatre called Dixon Stage Left, and a musician and visual arts co-op called Rosbrook Studio. The city has numerous festivals throughout the year including: Gardenstock Arts & Music Fest, Venitian Night on the Riverfront, a downtown wine festival, Blues-Brews-and BBQ, Reagan Trail Days, and the fall Scarecrow Festival.

Every summer Dixon holds the annual Petunia Festival featuring a parade, carnival (Farrow shows), country concert, fireworks show, and a 5K race—the Reagan Run. The parade features a multitude of floats from surrounding businesses, politicians, and other area groups. A carnival is also held in Dixon during this time, and the festival ends with the Fourth of July fireworks. The Downtown district has become a National Historic District. The Rock River which runs through the center of Dixon has been designated a National Waterway by the Federal Government. Dixon residents have supported a variety of large-scale projects that have created several aspects to their rural community. One aspect of this small town is that an individual can kayak the Rock River to the city's downtown docks and join a public Yoga session on the riverfront.

The Petunia Festival was conceived after Dutch Elm Disease and highway expansion wiped out the trees along the major roads in the late 1950s. In response to the dramatic change the streetscape underwent, the Dixon Men's Garden Club planted petunias along Galena Avenue to regain some sort of streetscape identity once again in the early 1960s. Before this annual festival, volunteers plant thousands of pink petunias along the main streets. The flowers are watered and maintained by the combined efforts of city workers and volunteers.

An iconic arch along Galena Avenue, just south of the Rock River, features the word "Dixon" in neon glasswork. Though commonly referred to as the Dixon Arch, the proper name for the structure is the War Memorial Arch. The Northwest Territory Historic Center is a History Research and Learning Center housed in President Ronald Reagan's boyhood South Central School. Restored with the dedicated support of the townspeople and Reagan colleagues, the Center is proudly affiliated with the Smithsonian Institution.

The Center houses the Veterans History Project Regional Center, auditorium, research library, historical exhibits, art gallery, surround-sound theater, and museum store.

Parks and recreation

The parks range from Lowell Park's  which is listed on the National Register of Historic Places; rural Meadows Park which encompasses  of recreational opportunities with natural areas and farm land; to neighborhood parks located throughout the city. Lee County, of which Dixon is the County Seat, offers many recreational areas and campgrounds; over 7,000 campsites are located within 17 miles of the city. Tourists from nearby Chicago take advantage of Lee County's recreational opportunities, particularly during summer weekends, adding approximately 20,000 people to the area's population.

Infrastructure

Health care
Dixon is a regional center for healthcare. The community has KSB Hospital which is a medical student teaching facility, 4 adult clinics, a children's clinic, 2 dialysis centers, 2 urgent care clinics, and is home to Sinnissippi Mental Health Center and the Northern Illinois Cancer Center. There is also a hospital, an infirmary, and a clinic for the mentally ill at the Dixon Correctional Center. The Mabley State Mental Health complex is also located in Dixon.

Airport
Dixon is served by the Dixon Municipal, Charles R Walgreen Field Airport, a general aviation only airport.

Notable people

Noah Brooks: journalist and biographier of Abraham Lincoln
William Conger: painter and educator
Hubert D. Considine: Illinois state representative and businessman.
Rita Crundwell: breeder of quarterhorses; embezzled approximately $53 million while Dixon comptroller in what is believed to be the largest municipal fraud in American history.
John Dement: 19th century politician and military commander.
John Deere: industrialist, manufacturer, invented first commercially successful steel plow; born in Vermont, lived in Grand Detour.
John Devine: professional bicycle racer.
John P. Devine: Speaker of the Illinois House of Representatives.
Sherwood Dixon: politician, 36th Lieutenant Governor of Illinois.
James K. Edsall: politician, Illinois Attorney General.
Samuel Cook Edsall: Episcopal Bishop of Minnesota.
Daniel G. Garnsey: United States Congressman.
Harriet E. Garrison (1848–1930), physician, writer 
Jerry Hey: five-time Grammy winner.
David Klamen: artist and academic
Jeanie Linders: writer and producer of Menopause: The Musical.
William H. McMaster: South Dakota state representative, state senator, lieutenant governor, governor, US senator, later banker in Dixon.
Ward T. Miller: professional baseball player in early 1900s for Pittsburgh Pirates, Cincinnati Reds, Chicago Cubs, St. Louis Terriers (FL) and St. Louis Browns.
Julia Swift Orvis, history professor at Wellesley College 
Louella Parsons (born Louella Rose Oettinger): influential newspaper columnist; born in Freeport and grew up in Dixon.
Ronald Reagan: 40th President of the United States, 33rd Governor of California, noted actor; born in Tampico and grew up in Dixon.
Rondi Reed: Tony Award-winning actress and singer.
Fred E. Sterling: politician.
Charles Rudolph Walgreen: founder of drugstore chain; he grew up in Dixon and began his career there as a pharmacist.
Minnie Gow Walsworth, poet
Larry Young: MLB umpire.
Isaiah Roby: NBA Oklahoma City Thunder

Sister cities 
Dixon has four sister cities.
 Dikson, Russia
 Herzberg, Germany
 Castlebar, Ireland
 Thika, Kenya

See also
Dixon High School
Sauk Valley Community College
Illinois Central Stone Arch Railroad Bridges
Nachusa House
William H. Van Epps House
Lincoln Highway
Ronald Reagan Trail
Nachusa Grasslands

References

External links

Dixon Chamber of Commerce

 
Cities in Illinois
Cities in Lee County, Illinois
County seats in Illinois
Micropolitan areas of Illinois
Populated places established in 1828
Ronald Reagan Trail
1828 establishments in Illinois